Suzie Wong (born Ko Chung Lau; 17 February 1955) is a popular DJ and TV cooking programme host in Hong Kong.

Wong came out as lesbian in 2010, and announced that her partner is Taiwanese actress Elaine Jin.

Notes

Wong, Suzie
Hong Kong women radio presenters
Hong Kong television presenters
Hong Kong women television presenters
Lesbian musicians
LGBT DJs
Hong Kong LGBT entertainers
Hong Kong LGBT musicians
University of Alberta alumni
Living people
1955 births